On 23 August 2019, 17-year-old Israeli Rina Shnerb was killed by a roadside bomb while hiking with her father, Rabbi Eitan Shnerb, and brother Dvir near Dolev, an Israeli settlement in the West Bank; her father and brother were wounded. Shnerb's funeral was held in Lod on 23 August.

Background

The murder took place near the spring of Ein Bubin, close to the Palestinian village of Deir Ibzi, whose lower lands near the spring area are abandoned because they are denied access save for two or three days a year. Springs, in particular, are flash-points in the conflict between Israelis settlers and the local Palestinian villagers in the Israeli-occupied West Bank, with, according to Dror Ektes, over 60 springs so far seized in the past 10 years, and thereupon reserved for Jewish use only.

According to Amira Hass, the site is one of nine in an area where, over three decades, the settlements of Dolev and Nahliel, and illegal Israeli outposts between them, have seized control over some 3,700 acres of Palestinian land.

Arrest of suspects and trial
In the aftermath, Israeli forces arrested three PFLP members allegedly responsible, one of whom was hospitalized with his life in danger after interrogation using "exceptional means" by Shin Bet.

On 5 March 2020, the Israeli Defense Force destroyed the homes of two suspected perpetrators in the Ramallah area.

Aftermath
Bezalel Smotrich of Yamina called for the annexation of the West Bank in response to Shnerb's killing. Hamas praised the attack, and Islamic Jihad called it a "natural response", while the Palestinian Authority said it was likely the work of a "highly organized cell" that posed a threat to the Palestinians as well as Israelis.

On 21 April 2020, eight months after the murder, which was Yom HaShoah, Rina's mother gave birth to a girl. Her parents considered naming the baby Rina but decided that "Rina is still with us in spirit", and gave the newly-born a different name.

Palestinian villagers have so far resisted efforts to take over the Ein Bubin spring and can still access it. The father, an IDF reserve military chaplain, said that his message to the murderers is "we are here and we are strong and we will prevail".

As a reaction to the attack, Dutch Minister for Foreign Trade and Development Cooperation Sigrid Kaag temporarily halted aid payments given to the Union of Agricultural Work Committees, an organisation which paid salaries to the perpetrators.

In April 2022, a new spring in the Jordan Valley was dedicated to Shnerb.

See also 
 List of terrorist incidents in August 2019
 Murder of Ori Ansbacher 
 Murder of Dvir Sorek

Notes

Citations

Sources

 
 
 
 
 
 
 

2019 murders in Asia
August 2019 crimes in Asia
Deaths by explosive device
Female murder victims
Israeli people murdered abroad
Palestinian terrorism
People murdered in the Palestinian territories
Terrorist incidents in the West Bank in 2019